Puntous is a commune in the Hautes-Pyrénées department in south-western France.

Geography
The Petite Baïse forms part of the commune's southern border, flows northward through the middle of the commune, then forms most of the commune's north-western border.

See also
Communes of the Hautes-Pyrénées department

References

Communes of Hautes-Pyrénées